Cyrtodactylus karsticolus is a species of gecko endemic to the South Garo Hills of Meghalaya, India, especially the Rongara Siju area.

References

Cyrtodactylus
Reptiles described in 2021
South Garo Hills district